Murski Petrovci is a village in the Municipality of Tišina in the Prekmurje region of northeastern Slovenia, next to the border with Austria.

The writer, poet, translator, and journalist Imre Augustich was born in Murski Petrovci.

References

External links
Murski Petrovci on Geopedia

Populated places in the Municipality of Tišina